Franziska Müller (born 12 March 1990) is a German handball player for HSG Blomberg-Lippe and the German national team.

She participated at the 2018 European Women's Handball Championship.

References

1990 births
Living people
German female handball players